Morton Plant North Bay Hospital is a hospital in New Port Richey, Florida. In 2010, two brand new buildings opened: Starkey Tower and the Medical Arts Building. In addition to the new buildings, the hospital opened the Richard and Laura Bekesh Education and Conference Center which hosts community lectures, support groups, and health screenings. North Bay Hospital is also home to Mitchell Rehabilitation Hospital, a 30-bed acute rehab facility.

References 

Hospital buildings completed in 1965
Hospital buildings completed in 2010
Buildings and structures in Pasco County, Florida
Hospitals in Florida
New Port Richey, Florida